Ali Habib Mahmud (‎; 1 January 1939 – 20 March 2020) was a Syrian military officer who served as Syria's minister of defense from June 2009 to August 2011. As one of Syria's most celebrated generals, he was part of President Bashar al-Assad's inner circle.

Early life and education
Mahmud was born into an Alawite family on 1 January 1939 in Tartus and joined the army in 1959. In 1962, he graduated from the military academy.

Career
Mahmud fought in the 1973 October War against Israel. He also led forces against Israeli troops invading Lebanon in 1982, including the Battle of Sultan Yacoub. He commanded 7th mechanized infantry in 1985. In 1986, Mahmud became a general. He also participated in the Gulf War as part of the international coalition to liberate Kuwait from Saddam Hussein's Iraq in 1990. In 1994, he was appointed commander of the special forces. In 1998, he was promoted to the rank of major general. He was appointed deputy chief of staff in 2002. On 12 May 2004, he was appointed chief of general staff of the Syrian army and the armed forces. He replaced Hasan Turkmani, who was appointed defense minister. In addition, Mahmud was a member of the Baath Party.

On 3 June 2009, President Bashar Assad appointed Mahmud as defense minister, replacing again Hasan Turkmani. Mahmud's term ended on 8 August 2011, and he was replaced by Dawoud Rajha in the post.

On 4 September 2013, the opposition wrongly claimed that Mahmud had defected and escaped to Turkey. In fact, he remained in Syria.

Sanctions
In May 2011, the United States accused Habib of human rights abuses, and announced a travel ban and asset freeze.

Death
On 20 March 2020, Mahmud died in Al Assad University Hospital, Damascus.

References

1939 births
2020 deaths
Syrian ministers of defense
Arab Socialist Ba'ath Party – Syria Region politicians
Chiefs of Staff of the Syrian Army
Syrian Alawites
People from Tartus